The Crown Army was the land service branch of the military forces of the Crown of the Kingdom of Poland in the Polish–Lithuanian Commonwealth. It existed from the establishment of the federation in 1569 until the Third Partition of Poland in 1795.

Citations

Notes

References

Bibliography 
Mariusz Machynia, Czesław Srzednicki: Oficerowie Rzeczypospolitej Obojga Narodów 1717-1794, vol.1 1: Oficerowie wojska koronnego, part 1: Sztaby i kawaleria. Kraków: Księgarnia Akademicka. Wydawnictwo Naukowe, 2002. ISBN 83-71-88-500-8.
Bronisław Gembarzewski: Rodowody pułków polskich i oddziałów równorzędnych od r. 1717 do r. 1831. Warsaw: Towarzystwo Wiedzy Wojskowej, 1925.

Military history of the Polish–Lithuanian Commonwealth
Disbanded armed forces
Military units and formations disestablished in 1795